The following are Marxist–Leninist groups that are or historically were considered to be anti-revisionist, i.e. groups that uphold the opinion that the Soviet Union diverged from socialist practice in 1956 under the leadership of Nikita Khrushchev.

Africa

Algeria 
 Algerian Party for Democracy and Socialism

Ethiopia 
 Marxist–Leninist League of Tigray

Tunisia 
 Tunisian Workers' Communist Party

Americas

Argentina 
 Communist Party of Argentina
 Communist Party of Argentina (Extraordinary Congress)
 Revolutionary Communist Party (Argentina)

Bolivia 
 Communist Party of Bolivia
 Communist Party of Bolivia (Marxist–Leninist)

Brazil 
 Brazilian Communist Party
 Communist Party of Brazil
 Revolutionary Communist Party (Brazil)

Canada 
 Communist Party of Canada
 Communist Party of Canada (Marxist–Leninist)

Chile 
 Communist Party of Chile
 Chilean Communist Party (Proletarian Action)
 Revolutionary Communist Party (Chile)

Colombia 
 Colombian Communist Party
 Colombian Communist Party – Maoist
 Communist Party of Colombia (Marxist–Leninist)
 Popular Liberation Army

Costa Rica 
 People's Vanguard Party (Costa Rica)

Dominican Republic 
 Communist Labour Party
 Communist Party of the Dominican Republic (Marxist–Leninist)
 Dominican Workers Party
 Dominican Workers' Party (Marxist–Leninist)

Ecuador 
 Communist Party of Ecuador
 Marxist-Leninist Communist Party of Ecuador
 Democratic Popular Movement
 Popular Unity (Ecuador)
 Workers' Party of Ecuador

Haiti 
 New Haitian Communist Party (Marxist–Leninist)

Mexico 
 Communist Party of Mexico (1994)
 Communist Party of Mexico (Marxist–Leninist)
 Popular Socialist Party of Mexico

Panama 
 Communist Party of Panama (Marxist–Leninist)
 People's Party of Panama

Paraguay 
 Paraguayan Communist Party
 Paraguayan Communist Party (independent)

Peru 
 Communist Party of Peru (Marxist–Leninist)
 Communist Party of Peru (Shining Path)
 Peruvian Communist Party
 Peruvian Communist Party (Marxist–Leninist)
 Proletarian Party of Peru
 Worker Peasant Student and Popular Front

United States 
 The American section of the Comintern (SH)
 Communist Party (Marxist–Leninist)
 Communist Party USA (Marxist–Leninist)
 Communist Workers' Party
 Freedom Road Socialist Organization
 Maoist Internationalist Movement
 Progressive Labor Party
 Revolutionary Communist Party, USA
 US Marxist-Leninist Organization
 Workers Party, USA

Uruguay 
 Revolutionary Communist Party (Uruguay)

Venezuela 
 Red Flag Party
 Marxist–Leninist Communist Party of Venezuela

Asia

Afghanistan 
 Communist (Maoist) Party of Afghanistan
 Marxist–Leninist Organization of Afghanistan

Azerbaijan 
 Azerbaijan Communist Party (1993)
 Communist Party of Azerbaijan

Bangladesh 
 Communist Party of Bangladesh (Marxist-Leninist)
 Communist Party of Bangladesh (Marxist–Leninist) (Dutta)
 Maoist Bolshevik Reorganisation Movement of the Purba Banglar Sarbahara Party
 Purba Banglar Sarbahara Party
 Socialist Party of Bangladesh
 Workers Party of Bangladesh

Bhutan 
 Communist Party of Bhutan (Marxist–Leninist–Maoist)

China 
 Maoist Communist Party of China

India 
 Bolshevik Party of India
 Communist Ghadar Party of India
 Communist League of India (Marxist–Leninist)
 Communist Party of Bharat
 Communist Party of India
 Communist Party of India (Marxist)
 Communist Party of India (Marxist–Leninist) Central Team
 Communist Party of India (Marxist–Leninist) Class Struggle
 Communist Party of India (Marxist–Leninist) Liberation
 Communist Party of India (Marxist–Leninist) (Mahadev Mukherjee)
 Communist Party of India (Marxist–Leninist) New Democracy
 Communist Party of India (Marxist–Leninist) Red Star
 Communist Party of India (Marxist–Leninist) Second Central Committee
 Central Reorganisation Committee, Communist Party of India (Marxist–Leninist)
 Communist Party of India (Maoist)
 Communist Party of United States of India
 Marxist Communist Party of India (United)
 Marxist Co-ordination Committee
 Marxist–Leninist Committee
 Marxist-Leninist Party of India (Red Flag)
 Peasants and Workers Party of India
 Revolutionary Communist Centre of India (Marxist–Leninist–Maoist)
 Revolutionary Communist Party of India
 Revolutionary Socialist Party (India)
 Revolutionary Socialist Party (Leninist)
 Revolutionary Marxist Party of India
 Socialist Unity Centre of India (Communist)
 United Communist Party of India
 Unity Centre of Communist Revolutionaries of India (Marxist–Leninist) (D.V. Rao)
 Workers Party of India

Iran 
 Communist Party of Iran (Marxist–Leninist–Maoist)
 Laborers' Party of Iran
 Labour Party of Iran (Toufan)

Jordan 
 Jordanian Communist Party

Kazakhstan 
 Communist Party of Kazakhstan
 Socialist Movement of Kazakhstan

Kyrgyzstan 
 Communist Party of Kyrgyzstan
 Party of Communists of Kyrgyzstan

Nepal 
 Communist Party of Nepal (Maoist Centre)
 Communist Party of Nepal (Unified Marxist–Leninist)
 Communist Party of Nepal (Marxist–Leninist) (2002)
 Communist Party of Nepal (Marxist) (2006)
 Communist Party of Nepal (Masal) (2006)
 Communist Party of Nepal (2013)
 Communist Party of Nepal (2014)
 Communist Party of Nepal (Revolutionary Maoist)
 Communist Party of Nepal (Unified Socialist)
 Rastriya Janamorcha
 Nepal Workers Peasants Party

Pakistan 
 Communist Mazdoor Kisan Party
 Mazdoor Kisan Party

Philippines 
 Communist Party of the Philippines

Sri Lanka 
 Ceylon Communist Party (Maoist)
 New Democratic Marxist–Leninist Party

Syria 
 Syrian Communist Party (Bakdash)

Tajikistan 
 Communist Party of Tajikistan

Turkey 
 Bolshevik Party (North Kurdistan – Turkey)
 Communist Party of Turkey/Marxist–Leninist
 Communist Party of Turkey/Marxist–Leninist – Hareketi
 Communist Party of Turkey/Marxist–Leninist (New Build-Up Organization)
 Marxist–Leninist Communist Party (Turkey)
 Maoist Communist Party (Turkey)
 Revolutionary Communist League of Turkey
 Revolutionary Communist Party of Turkey

Turkmenistan 
Communist Party of Turkmenistan (1998)

Uzbekistan 
Communist Party of Uzbekistan (1994)

Europe

Albania 
 Party of Labour of Albania

Armenia 
 Armenian Communist Party
 United Communist Party of Armenia

Austria 
 Party of Labour of Austria

Belarus 
 Communist Party of Belarus
 Communist Party of the Workers of Belarus

Belgium 
 Communist Party of Belgium (1989)
 Workers Party of Belgium

Bulgaria 
 Bulgarian Communist Party (modern)
 Bulgarian Workers' Party (Communist)
 Communist Party of Bulgaria
 Party of the Bulgarian Communists
 Union of Communists in Bulgaria

Croatia 
 Red Action (Croatia)

Cyprus 
 Progressive Party of Working People

Czech Republic 
 Communist Party of Bohemia and Moravia
 Communist Party of Czechoslovakia – Czechoslovakian Labor Party

Denmark 
 Communist Party (Denmark)
 Communist Party of Denmark
 Communist Party in Denmark
 Workers' Communist Party (Denmark)

Estonia 
 Communist Party of Estonia (1990)

Finland 
 Communist Party of Finland (1994)
 Communist Workers' Party – For Peace and Socialism

France 
 Communist Revolutionary Party of France
 Communist Revolutionary Party (France)
 Marxist-Leninist Proletarian Union
 Pole of Communist Revival in France
 Workers Communist Party of France

Germany 
 Communist Party of Germany (Marxist–Leninist)
 German Communist Party
 Marxist-Leninist Party of Germany

Georgia 
 Communist Party of Georgia
 New Communist Party of Georgia
 Unified Communist Party of Georgia

Greece 
 Communist Organization of Greece
 Communist Party of Greece
 Communist Party of Greece (Marxist–Leninist)
 Marxist-Leninist Communist Party of Greece
 Movement for the Reorganization of the Communist Party of Greece 1918-55

Hungary 
 Hungarian Socialist Workers' Party (1993)
 Hungarian Workers' Party

Ireland 
 Communist Party of Ireland
 Irish Republican Socialist Party
 Workers' Party

Italy 
 Communist Party (Italy)
 Italian Communist Party (2016)
 Italian Marxist-Leninist Party
 Unified Communist Party of Italy

Latvia 
 Socialist Party of Latvia

Lithuania 
 Socialist People's Front

Luxembourg 
 Communist Party of Luxembourg

Macedonia 
 Communist Party of Macedonia (1992)
 The Left (North Macedonia)

Netherlands 
 New Communist Party of the Netherlands
 Group of Marxist–Leninists/Red Dawn

Norway 
 Communist Party of Norway

Malta 
 Communist Party of Malta

Moldova 
 Party of Communists of the Republic of Moldova
 People's Resistance

Poland 
 Polish Communist Party (2002)

Portugal 
 Portuguese Communist Party
 Portuguese Workers' Communist Party

Russia 
 All-Union Communist Party of Bolsheviks (1991)
 Communist Party of the Russian Federation
 Russian Communist Workers' Party of the Communist Party of the Soviet Union
 Russian Maoist Party

Serbia 
 New Communist Party of Yugoslavia
 Party of Labour (Serbia)

Spain 
 Communist Party of Spain (Marxist–Leninist)
 Communist Party of Spain (Marxist–Leninist) (historical)
 Communist Party of Spain (Reconstituted)
 Communist Party of the Peoples of Spain
 Communist Party of the Workers of Spain
 Communist Unification of Spain
 Marxist–Leninist Front of the Peoples of Spain
 Marxist-Leninist Party (Communist Reconstruction)
 Spanish Communist Workers' Party (1973)
 Revolutionary Communist Party (Spain)
 Workers' Party (Spain)

Slovakia 
 Communist Party of Slovakia
 VZDOR

Sweden 
 Communist Party (Sweden)
 Communist Party of Sweden (1995)

Ukraine 
 Communist Party of Ukraine
 Union of Communists of Ukraine

United Kingdom 
 Communist Party Alliance
 Communist Party of Britain
 Communist Party of Britain (Marxist–Leninist)
 Communist Party of Great Britain (Marxist–Leninist)
 International Leninist Workers Party
 New Communist Party of Britain
 Revolutionary Communist Party of Britain (Marxist–Leninist)
 Stalin Society

Oceania

Australia 
 Communist Party of Australia (1971)
 Communist Party of Australia (Marxist–Leninist)

References

Anti-revisionist groups